Feyisetan Fayose is a Nigerian philanthropist, human rights activist, and former first lady of Ekiti State as the wife of Ayo Fayose.

Feyisetan Fayose was born 8 January 1964.
She is also the grand patron of Ekiti state chapter of National Union of Female Journalists.

References

1964 births
Living people
Nigerian human rights activists
Nigerian philanthropists
Women philanthropists